"Oh Carol" is a song by the British rock band Smokie from their 1978 studio album The Montreux Album. It was the album's second single. The song first came out in May 1978 as a single and later appeared on the album, which was released in October.

Background and writing 
The song was written by Nicky Chinn and Mike Chapman and produced by Mike Chapman.

Charts

Year-end charts

Cover versions 
In early 2000 Chris Norman issued his solo version of this song as a single (CD maxi) in Europe.

The version was part of his 2000 studio album "Full Circle".

References

External links 
 Smokie — "Oh Carol" (1978) at Discogs
 Chris Norman — "Oh Carol" (2000) at Discogs

1978 songs
1978 singles
Smokie (band) songs
Songs written by Nicky Chinn
Songs written by Mike Chapman
Song recordings produced by Mike Chapman
RAK Records singles
Chris Norman songs